Gornet is a commune in Prahova County, Muntenia, Romania. It has a population of 3,126 (2002) and is composed of four villages: Bogdănești, Cuib, Gornet and Nucet.

At the 2002 census, 100% of inhabitants were ethnic Romanians and 99.9% were Romanian Orthodox.

On 22 July 2020, due to the COVID-19 pandemic authorities decided to locally quarantine this commune.

References

Communes in Prahova County
Localities in Muntenia